Maksim Grechikha (born 10 June 1993) is a Belarusian professional footballer who plays for Volna Pinsk.

References

External links
 
 

1993 births
Living people
Sportspeople from Vitebsk
Belarusian footballers
Association football midfielders
FC Vitebsk players
FC Slonim-2017 players
FC Orsha players
FC Torpedo Minsk players
FC Luch Minsk (2012) players
FC Volna Pinsk players